Efisio Tola, (1803 – 12 June 1833) was an Italian patriot.
Born in Sassari, Sardinia to a noble family, he was the brother of the politician and magistrate Pasquale Tola.

Efisio Tola was lieutenant of the Pinerolo Brigade, and a member of the Giovine Italia. Due to his membership he was arrested. Tola  refused to reveal the names of his companions, and was sentenced to death in Chambéry (then part of the Kingdom of Sardinia) in 1833.

In Sassari the Piazza Tola (Piazza Efisio e Pasquale Tola) in the historical centre is named after the brothers.

Bibliography
Sebastiano Deledda, Una biografia inedita di Efisio Tola. Sassari, Stamperia della Libreria italiana e straniera, 1931.

References

People from Sassari
1803 births
1833 deaths
Italian military personnel
People from the Kingdom of Sardinia
Italian republicans
Italian people of the Italian unification
People executed by Italy by firing squad
Executed Italian people